Microhypsibiidae is a family of water bear or moss piglet, a tardigrade in the class Eutardigrada.
It contains the following species in two genera
 Fractonotus
 Fractonotus caelatus (Marcus 1928)
 Microhypsibius
 Microhypsibius bertolanii Kristensen, 1982
 Microhypsibius japonicus Ito, 1991
 Microhypsibius minimus Kristensen, 1982
 Microhypsibius truncatus Thulin, 1928

References

External links

Parachela (tardigrade)
Tardigrade families
Polyextremophiles